"Barbie Girl" is a song by Danish-Norwegian dance-pop group Aqua. It was released in April 1997 as the third single from the group's debut studio album, Aquarium (1997). The song was written by Søren Rasted, Claus Norreen, René Dif, and Lene Nystrøm, and was produced by Johnny Jam, Delgado, Rasted, and Norreen. It was written after Rasted saw an exhibit on kitsch culture in Denmark that featured Barbie dolls.

The song topped the charts worldwide, particularly in European countries such as the United Kingdom, where it was a number-one hit for four weeks and remains one of the best-selling singles of all time. It also reached number two in the group's homeland and peaked at number seven on the US Billboard Hot 100, where it remains Aqua's biggest hit single and their only one to reach the top 10 of the Hot 100. It is Aqua's most popular work and was also performed as the interval act in the Eurovision Song Contest 2001. It also became the subject of the controversial lawsuit Mattel, Inc. v. MCA Records, Inc.

Background and composition

The lyrics of the song are about Barbie and Ken, the dolls made by Mattel. Both the song and its music video feature Lene Nystrøm as Barbie and René Dif as Ken. As such, the lyrics drew the ire of Barbie's corporate owners, and a lawsuit was filed by Mattel.

A footnote on the back of the Aquarium CD case precisely stated that "The song 'Barbie Girl' is a social comment and was not created or approved by the makers of the doll." "Barbie Girl" is written in the key of C-sharp minor and has a tempo of 130 beats per minute.

Reception

Critical reception
"Barbie Girl" received critical acclaim. Larry Flick from Billboard wrote that "with her squeaky, high-pitched delivery, Lene Grawford Nystrøm fronts this giddy pop/dance ditty as if she were Barbie, gleefully verbalizing many of the twisted things people secretly do with the doll." He noted that "at the same time, she effectively rants about the inherent misogyny of Barbie with a subversive hand", adding that René Dif is an "equally playful and biting presence, as he embodies male counterpart Ken with an amusing leer." Scottish Daily Record stated, "Love them or hate them, you have to admit Aqua's silly doll song is pure pop and the video is great, too". David Browne from Entertainment Weekly described it as a "dance-floor novelty that alludes to the secret, less-than-wholesome life of every little girl's fave doll." Another editor, Jeremy Helligar, commented, "There must be something in that Northern European water. Like recent tunes by their Swedish-pop counterparts Ace of Base and the Cardigans, these Danish newcomers' frothy debut is fun, fun, fun — but oh so disposable." British magazine Music Week gave "Barbie Girl" five out of five and named it Single of the Week, concluding, "Bleached and blonde this bouncy Europop tune may be, but dumb it isn't. Its mix of perky vocals, barbed lyrics and infectious energy has already brought it success in Scandinavia and the US. The video is irresistible." 

A reviewer from People Magazine called it "the year's best novelty record, a cartoonish anthem you'll need surgery to remove from your head." James Hyman from the RM Dance Update gave the song top score, declaring it as "a Balearic-tinged Euro pop smash hit. The hooks are various Lene G squeaks, mainly "l'm a Barbie Girl, In the Barbie world, Life in plastic, its fantastic", while Rene Difs' frisky retorts act out the part of Ken." He added, "My niece refuses to go to bed unless the video is played several times over; I think that speaks for itself with regard to ongoing single success." Kevin Courtney from Irish Times also named it Single of the Week, writing, "A supreme slice of cheese which out-hums even the mighty Whigfield, "Barbie Girl" is the big US hit which has Mattel Inc, the makers of Barbie and Ken, in a tizzy over its naughty bits. The Scandinavian group have hit the perfect wally beat, and this awful tune is set to dominate the dance-floor and do kinky things to it. I'll get me handbag."

Commercial performance
"Barbie Girl" has sold more than eight million copies worldwide. It went on becoming a huge hit on several continents, remaining the most successful song by the band. It reached number one in more than 10 countries. In Europe, the single peaked at the top position in Belgium, France, Germany, Ireland, Italy, the Netherlands, Norway, Scotland, Sweden, Switzerland, and the United Kingdom, as well as on the Eurochart Hot 100. In the band's native Denmark, the song debuted and peaked at number two. In the United Kingdom, it debuted on the UK Singles Chart at number two and reached number one the next week, on 26 October 1997. It stayed at that position for four weeks and has sold 1.84 million copies in the United Kingdom as of April 2017, making it the thirteenth best-selling single in the UK. Outside Europe, "Barbie Girl" peaked at number-one in Australia and New Zealand, number four in Canada and number seven on the US Billboard Hot 100. On the latter, it debuted at that position. It sold 82,000 copies in its first week and debuted at number five on the Billboard Hot Singles Sales chart.

Retrospective response
Stephen Thomas Erlewine from AllMusic called "Barbie Girl" "one of those inexplicable pop culture phenomena" and "insanely catchy", describing it as a "bouncy, slightly warped Euro-dance song that simultaneously sends up femininity and Barbie dolls." Insider stated that the song is "sugary sweet" and "totally catchy", viewing it as one of the best songs of the '90s. In an retrospective review, Pop Rescue wrote that "this song is fun, undoubtedly catchy, and bouncy, with the personas of Barbie and Ken fitting perfectly with the vocal contrast."

Music video
The accompanying music video for "Barbie Girl" was directed by Danish directors Peder Pedersen and Peter Stenbæk, and depicts the band members in different scenes that a Barbie doll would be in. It has Nystrøm dressed as various Barbie dolls skulking around her swimming pool at home after Dif, dressed as Barbie's love interest Ken, accidentally pulls her arm off. The video was also the number one most requested video in the US, having shot from 30 to number one on The Box. Uploaded to YouTube in August 2010, as of February 2022, the video has more than 1 billion views.

Impact and legacy
The song ranked number 88 in a VH1 countdown, "VH1's 100 Greatest One-Hit Wonders". In 2017, BuzzFeed listed the song at number 76 in their list of "The 101 Greatest Dance Songs Of the '90s".

Controversies

Mattel lawsuit

In September 1997, six months after the release of the song by Aqua, Mattel, the manufacturer of the Barbie doll, sued MCA Records, Aqua's North American record label. Mattel claimed that "Barbie Girl" violated their trademark and turned her into a sex object, referring to her as a "blonde bimbo". It alleged that the song infringed its copyrights and trademarks on the Barbie doll and that the song's lyrics had ruined the longtime popularity and reputation of their trademark and impinged on their marketing plan. Aqua and MCA Records claimed that Mattel injected their own meanings into the song's lyrics. They contested Mattel's claims and countersued for defamation after Mattel had likened MCA to a bank robber. The lawsuit filed by Mattel was dismissed by the lower courts, and this dismissal was upheld, though Mattel took their case up to the Supreme Court of the United States, but that appeal was later rejected.

In 2002, a Court of Appeals ruled the song was protected as a parody under the trademark doctrine of nominative use and the First Amendment to the United States Constitution; the judge Alex Kozinski also threw out the defamation lawsuit that Aqua's record company filed against Mattel, concluding his ruling thus: "The parties are advised to chill." The case was dismissed.

In 2009, Mattel released a series of advertisements and a promotional music video of the song, with modified lyrics, as part of a new marketing strategy brought in to revive sales. Despite this, the upcoming Mattel-produced film Barbie will not feature the Aqua song, as stated by Ulrich Møller-Jørgensen, who manages lead singer Lene Nystrøm.

Eurovision Song Contest 2001
As the interval act during the Eurovision Song Contest 2001, Aqua performed a medley of their singles along with percussion ensemble Safri Duo. There were several complaints due to the profanity used during the performance, both at the beginning and end of "Barbie Girl".

Track listings

 Danish and European CD and cassette single
 "Barbie Girl" (radio edit) – 3:16
 "Barbie Girl" (extended version) – 5:14

 UK CD1
 "Barbie Girl" (radio edit) – 3:16
 "Barbie Girl" (extended version) – 5:14
 "Barbie Girl" (Perky Park club mix) – 6:13
 "Barbie Girl" (Spikes Anatomically Correct dub) – 7:55

 UK CD2
 "Barbie Girl" (CD-ROM video)
 "Barbie Girl" (radio edit)
 "Barbie Girl" (Dirty Rotten Scoundrels 12-inch G-String mix)
 "Barbie Girl" (Dirty Rotten Peroxide radio mix)

 US CD and cassette single
 "Barbie Girl" (radio edit) – 3:16

 US, Canadian, and Australian maxi-CD single
 "Barbie Girl" (radio edit) – 3:16
 "Barbie Girl" (Spike's Plastic mix) – 8:44
 "Barbie Girl" (Spike's Anatomically Correct dub) – 7:55
 "Barbie Girl" (extended version) – 5:14

 US 12-inch single
A1. "Barbie Girl" (Spike's Plastic mix) – 8:44
A2. "Barbie Girl" (radio edit) – 3:16
B1. "Barbie Girl" (Spike's Anatomically Correct dub) – 7:55
B2. "Barbie Girl" (extended version) – 5:14

Credits
Credits are adapted from liner notes of the "Barbie Girl" CD single and Aquarium.
 Written by Norreen, Nystrøm, Dif, Rasted
 Performed by Norreen, Rasted
 Vocals by Nystrøm, Dif
 Hair and make-up by Fjodor Øxenhave
 Styling by Aqua, Bjarne Lindgreen
 Artwork by Peter Stenbæk
 Photo by Robin Skoldborg
 Produced, arranged, and mixed by Norreen, Jam, Delgado, Rasted

Charts

Weekly charts

Year-end charts

Decade-end charts

All-time charts

Certifications and sales

Release history

Cover versions and parodies
The song has been covered by several artists over the years. Alternative metal band Faith No More covered the song live in 1997 during their Album of the Year tour. Identical twin sisters Amanda and Samantha Marchant, better known as Samanda, released their cover of the song on 8 October 2007, and it entered the UK Singles Chart at number 26. Girls' Generation's Jessica Jung covered this song as her solo performance during the first Asian concert tour Girls' Generation 1st Asia Tour: Into the New World. The Swedish artist Loke Nyberg did a new version of this song for the Swedish radio show Morgonpasset. He interprets the song as criticism of today's beauty ideals. In 2013, Ludacris sampled the song in his single "Party Girls" featuring Wiz Khalifa, Jeremih and Cashmere Cat. In 2016, Caramella Girls released a version called "Candy Girl" on iTunes, as well as a YouTube music video.

There are also many parodies of the song, including a parody called "Ugly Girl", with an unverified author (often wrongly credited to "Weird Al" Yankovic, Adam Henderson, or Jack Off Jill). German duo Lynne & Tessa made a lip-synched Internet video of the song in 2006, and on British Indian sketch comedy show Goodness Gracious Me, where a version titled "Punjabi Girl" was featured in the radio series and later on television. In 2012, the song was parodied in an Australian lamb advertising campaign, relying on the Australian use of the term "barbie" to refer to the outdoor barbecue popularly held in Australia. The advertisement starred Melissa Tkautz and Sam Kekovich. In 2014, the song was used in the South Park episode "Cock Magic". Ava Max recorded a version with new lyrics, titled "Not Your Barbie Girl", in 2018.

In 1999,  released an Indonesian version of this song with the title "Boneka Barbie".

Kelly Key version

In 2005, Brazilian recording artist Kelly Key recorded a version in Portuguese for her third studio album Kelly Key. The version was released as second single on 15 August 2005. Key said she loved the song and wanted to do a version for honor: "I really like this song since I heard. I wanted to record without thinking about whether my fans will like it or not".

The song received generally negative reviews from music critics. Vinícius Versiani Durães of IMHO said that that version was funny and a future success. Marcos Paulo Bin of Universo Musical commented that the song was really different from previous releases – known for explicit lyrics – but was positive and said the version was good. Rodrigo Ortega of Pilula Pop said "Barbie Girl" was sensational, funny, and chose it as the best song of the album. He also said that Key was wrong to have released "Escuta Aqui Rapaz" as her first single, because "the song was boring", but "Barbie Girl" saved the era. Carlos Eduardo Lima of Scream & Yell was negative and said the song was "childish, silly, boring" and killed Kelly Key as a sex-symbol.

The music video for "Barbie Girl" was recorded on 17 and 18 August 2005. It was directed by Ricardo Vereza, Bidu Madio, Rentz and Mauricio Eça. In the video, released on 30 August, Kelly plays a determined and feminist woman.

This song is internationally notable to be wrongly attributed to Czech model Dominika Myslivcová as she uploaded a video in YouTube lip-synching to this song and later it became a viral video.

Track listing
 "Barbie Girl" – 3:20
 "Barbie Girl" (Cuca Mix) – 5:12
 "Barbie Girl" (Music video) – 3:23

Release history

References in media
Environmental movements, like Fridays for Future, when trying to bring attention to the heavy amounts of plastic thrown by humans into the seas, have referred the song lyrics in their slogans with the words "Life in plastic is not fantastic".

In 2022, British singer Tom Aspaul named his album Life In Plastic after a line from the song.

References

External links
 
 Text of Mattel, Inc. v. MCA Records, Inc., the verdict that favored MCA (PDF file)

1997 singles
1997 songs
Aqua (band) songs
Girl
Bubblegum pop songs
Dutch Top 40 number-one singles
Eurodance songs
European Hot 100 Singles number-one singles
Irish Singles Chart number-one singles
Kelly Key songs
Male–female vocal duets
Music controversies
Novelty songs
Number-one singles in Australia
Number-one singles in Germany
Number-one singles in Italy
Number-one singles in New Zealand
Number-one singles in Norway
Number-one singles in Scotland
Number-one singles in Sweden
Number-one singles in Switzerland
SNEP Top Singles number-one singles
Songs about fictional female characters
Songs written by Claus Norreen
Songs written by Søren Rasted
Viral videos
Techno songs
UK Singles Chart number-one singles